Cocytus  or Kokytos  (literally "lamentation") is the river of wailing  in the underworld in Greek mythology. Cocytus flows into the river Acheron, on the other side of which lies Hades, the underworld, the mythological abode of the dead. There are five rivers encircling Hades: the Styx, Phlegethon, Lethe, Acheron and Cocytus.

In literature 
The Cocytus river was one of the rivers that surrounded Hades. Cocytus, along with the other rivers related to the underworld, was a common topic for ancient authors.  Of the ancient authors, Cocytus was mentioned by Virgil, Homer, Cicero, Aeschylus, Apuleius and Plato, among others.

Cocytus also makes an appearance in John Milton's epic poem Paradise Lost.  In Book Two, Milton speaks of "Cocytus, named of lamentation loud / Heard on the rueful stream".

It is also mentioned in William Shakespeare's Titus Andronicus and in Rick Riordan's The House of Hades.

Cocytus also appears in Friedrich Schiller's poem "Gruppe aus dem Tartarus": ...Hohl sind ihre Augen—ihre Blicke/ Spähen bang nach des Cocytus Brücke... (...Hollow are their eyes, their looks / Peering anxiously to the bridge of Cocytus...)

The river is also mentioned in Rafael Sabatini's novel Captain Blood: His Odyssey, when Colonel Bishop's nemesis, Peter Blood, addresses him as follows: "And now, ye greasy hangman, step out as brisk and lively as ye can, and behave as naturally as ye may, or it's the black stream of Cocytus ye'll be contemplating."

In the Divine Comedy

In Inferno, the first cantica of Dante's Divine Comedy, Cocytus is the ninth and lowest circle of The Underworld. Dante and Virgil are placed there by the giant Antaeus. There are other Giants around the rim that are chained; however Antaeus is unchained as he died before the Gigantomachy. Cocytus is referred to as a frozen lake rather than a river, although it originates from the same source as the other infernal rivers, the tears of a statue called The Old Man of Crete which represents the sins of humanity. Dante describes Cocytus as being the home of traitors and those who committed acts of complex fraud. Depending on the form of their treachery, inhabitants are buried in ice to a varying degree, anywhere from neck-high to completely submerged in ice. Cocytus is divided into four descending "rounds", or sections:

Caina, after the Biblical Cain; traitors to blood relatives.
Antenora, after Antenor from the Iliad; traitors to country.
Ptolomea, after Ptolemy, governor of Jericho, who murdered his guests (1 Maccabees); traitors to guests. Here it is said that sometimes the soul of a traitor falls to Hell before Atropos cuts the thread, and their body is taken over by a fiend.
Judecca, after Judas Iscariot; traitors to masters and benefactors.

Dante's Satan is at the center of the circle buried waist-high in ice. He is depicted with three faces and mouths. The central mouth gnaws Judas. Judas is chewed head foremost with his feet protruding and Satan's claws tearing his back while those gnawed in the side mouths, Brutus and Cassius, leading assassins of Julius Caesar, are both chewed feet foremost with their heads protruding. Under each chin Satan flaps a pair of wings, which only serve to increase the cold winds in Cocytus and further imprison him and other traitors. Dante and his guide Virgil proceed then to climb down Satan's back and then upwards towards Purgatory, though Dante is at first confused at their turning round, but Virgil explains it is due to the change in forces as they pass through the center of the Earth.

References 

Rivers of Hades
Divine Comedy